St Luke's Church is in Lodge Road, Orrell, Wigan, Greater Manchester, England.  It is an active Anglican parish church in the deanery of Wigan, the archdeaconry of Warrington, and the diocese of Liverpool.

History

The three west bays of St Luke's were built in 1926–27, but the remainder was not completed until 1939.  It had been planned to have a southwest tower, but this was never built.  The church was designed by Henry Paley of the Lancaster firm of architects Austin and Paley.

Architecture

The church is designed mainly in Perpendicular style, and has a polygonal apse at the east end.  Inside the church, the arcades are carried on octagonal piers.  Under the chancel arch is a low wall with an integral pulpit.  The sedilia and furnishings were designed by the architects, and include an octagonal font.

External features

The churchyard contains the war graves of a soldier and three airmen of World War II.

See also

List of ecclesiastical works by Austin and Paley (1916–44)
List of churches in Greater Manchester

References

Church of England church buildings in Greater Manchester
Churches completed in 1938
20th-century Church of England church buildings
Gothic Revival church buildings in England
Gothic Revival architecture in Greater Manchester
Anglican Diocese of Liverpool
Austin and Paley buildings